Dorian Gregory (born January 26, 1971) is an American actor and television host who played Darryl Morris on the television show Charmed (1998–2005) and was the fourth and final permanent host of Soul Train, replacing Shemar Moore.

Background 
Gregory was born in Washington, D.C. and raised in Cleveland, Ohio until age nine, when he and his family moved to Los Angeles, California. He began his acting career with guest roles on such series as Baywatch, Beverly Hills, 90210, and Sister, Sister, among others. His first major role was in the main cast of Baywatch Nights from 1996 to 1997.

Career 
In 1998, he played the police officer Darryl Morris in the television series Charmed, which he played until end of season 7, in 2005, when the character was cut due to budget reasons. In 2002, he replaced cosmetic surgeon Jan Adams as one of the hosts of the male-oriented daytime talk show, The Other Half, which was canceled the following year.

Gregory has hosted several events, such as the BET Anniversary and Achievement Awards with Debbie Allen and Shirley Moore, the Black Stuntwomen Beach Competition, and the Elite Lee Jeans Model Look with Roshumba Williams and Angelica Bridges. He has also hosted a radio show on black writers, supports minority filmmakers, and appeared at high school dedications to support better educational opportunities. He is a founding member of Epiphany Theater Group, established by writer/producer/director Bill Duke. In 2010, Gregory made an impromptu appearance on The Tonight Show with Jay Leno in the "Jaywalking segment". Jay Leno was apparently unaware of who Gregory was until Gregory informed him.

Personal life 
Gregory is actively involved in the Jeopardy Program, sponsored by the Los Angeles Police Department for youth at risk, as well as serves as the National Spokesman for the Juvenile Diabetes Research Foundation. He was diagnosed with Juvenile (Type 1) diabetes when he was a child, and now talks to young adults and children on the subject as a motivational speaker. Gregory is working to raise funds to help find a cure for diabetes and offering information to support people living with the disease. He is also involved with AIDS Project Los Angeles and Mothers Against Drunk Driving (MADD).

Gregory has a music group with his sister, Mercedes Bey, called "MD Says", which stands for "Mercedes and Dorian Says". Their group has music running in Europe as well as domestic pick ups He is also cutting more songs for a long-awaited album release.

He began his writing career as a poet (and penned "Ashley Moore" and "Deep Deep Purple"). His passion for writing progressed naturally into music, and has evolved to writing plays and movie scripts, including the play Room Mates for Life.

Filmography

Film

Television

References

External links 

1971 births
Living people
American male television actors
American television personalities
African-American male actors
American motivational speakers
American humanitarians
Male actors from Cleveland
People with type 1 diabetes
Male actors from Washington, D.C.
Activists from Ohio
21st-century African-American people
20th-century African-American people
Soul Train